Rosella Thorne (11 December 1930 – 16 April 2022) was a Canadian sprinter. She competed in the women's 100 metres at the 1952 Summer Olympics.

Thorne later moved to California in the United States, where she worked as a maths instructor at Merced College.

References

External links
  

1930 births
2022 deaths
Athletes (track and field) at the 1952 Summer Olympics
Canadian female sprinters
Canadian female long jumpers
Canadian female high jumpers
Canadian female hurdlers
Olympic track and field athletes of Canada
Athletes (track and field) at the 1950 British Empire Games
Athletes (track and field) at the 1954 British Empire and Commonwealth Games
Commonwealth Games competitors for Canada
Anglophone Quebec people
Athletes from Montreal